Georgina Sparks is a fictional character in the Gossip Girl novel series and a recurring character on the television series of the same name, in which she is portrayed by Michelle Trachtenberg. 

While the novel series portrays her as a harmless, friendly drug-addicted young girl, the television adaption portrays her as a cruel, manipulative young socialite who creates havoc throughout the show. Originally conceived as the series' primary antagonist, by the final season Georgina came into the good graces of the Upper East Side - even becoming a member of their inner circle. 

She is notable for her manipulative machinations and sudden returns throughout the series, and for appearing in all the finales, and most recently the latter half of the fifth season in light of cast members Taylor Momsen and Jessica Szohr departing. In the sixth and final season of the show, she appears in 8 of 10 episodes. Georgina also appears in the second season of the HBO Max sequel series.

Novel series
Georgina "Georgie" Spark (Sparks in the television series), a wealthy girl and New York City Celebutante, as well as a drug addict who has blood red lips and long glossy dark hair, meets Nate Archibald in rehab. The two date for a while, and one night, Nate comes over to her mansion. While he is there, Georgina overdoses on various pills, and Nate saves her life by calling their drug counselor. Afterwards, Nate and Georgina go to Sun Valley for spring break, and Georgie briefly meets Serena van der Woodsen and Blair Waldorf (it is hinted that Georgina and Serena previously met in boarding school). Georgina's relationship with Nate ends when she and Chuck Bass are arrested for having sex on a public highway. She then goes back to rehab, this time in Switzerland. A noticeable difference between her character in the book and television series is that in the book series, Georgina has no cruel intentions towards anyone and never really gets involved with the main characters.

Television series

Casting
Tim Stack of Entertainment Weekly reported that Michelle Trachtenberg took on the role that actress Mischa Barton had been previously offered. The Buffy alumna was cast into the role of Georgina Sparks, described by Michael Ausiello as "an adolescent Cruella". Creator Josh Schwartz states that, "Georgina was [Serena's] enabler, her best friend, and her id." The actress stated that the character is "basically the evil bitch from hell" and that "She's been part of the Gossip kids' lives for a long time, and she's coming back around to make her presence known." She describes the role as "the best character I have ever played," saying "It's awesome playing the bad girl," and compared her previous role on Buffy as something very different from her current role as Georgina. She has stated that the character is "incredibly evil, manipulative and pretty much just takes no prisoners, and she doesn't care about the consequences." Trachtenberg also draws her on her "own painful teen experience in her L.A. private school," citing her work on Harriet the Spy as an inspiration for her portrayal of the character.

Season 1
Georgina Sparks, a girl from Serena van der Woodsen's past who used to party with her, returns to New York from Switzerland. Georgina is first mentioned in "The Blair Bitch Project" when Serena discovers that it was she (and not Chuck as previously suspected) who was the one who had been sending her packages of champagne, porn, sex toys and drugs. Serena apologises to Chuck and shows him Georgina's letter. However, he later reassures her that Georgina is still in Switzerland.

Although Chuck assured her, Georgina steals her family's jet and arrives in Manhattan in "Desperately Seeking Serena" and surprises Serena with a visit to Constance. Serena's plans to study with Dan Humphrey for the SATs are cut short when Georgina persuades her to go out and have drinks to catch up with each other. Serena reluctantly agrees, but after a few cocktails, Serena's wild-child persona returns. Serena reverts to her good girl persona however when she answers a call meant for Georgina that reveals she is still in contact with drug dealers and leaves, realizing that Georgina hasn't changed and that she missed her study date with Dan, which she and Chuck cover up with food poisoning. Serena apologises for the missed study plans and says she will meet Dan and Blair at the SATs the next day. Georgina calls her again, asking her to go to dinner with her. Serena declines the offer at first but Georgina assures that there won't be any wild partying and tells her how she has been inspired to turn her life around after seeing Serena the other day. Impressed, Serena meets Georgina for dinner, who compliments her on how much she's changed. When Serena gets up from the table to call Dan, Georgina drugs Serena's Diet Coke. Serena wakes up frantic the next morning in Georgina's apartment, and ends up missing her SATs. Georgina packs her bags to leave Manhattan until Serena confronts her, seeking to end their friendship, having realized that she makes too many mistakes when she's around her. Georgina recounts an incident which Serena quickly dismisses before it is revealed. Unfortunately for Serena, Georgina changes her mind, unpacks her bags and ends up meeting Dan in Central Park, introducing herself as Sarah.

Under the guise of Sarah, Georgina becomes friends with Dan and Vanessa determined to impose her presence in Serena's life. Georgina sends Serena a video of what appears to be Serena in a sex tape and then invites herself in to the van der Woodsen's home subsequently outing Eric during dinner. Distressed, Serena runs to Dan, he introduces her to Sarah who Serena is shocked to discover is Georgina in disguise. Georgina then proceeds to blackmail Serena with the video threatening to reveal all the dark secrets from her past.

Serena has a breakdown and eventually confesses to Blair, Nate and Chuck. It is revealed that after Serena had sex with Nate at a wedding, Serena went to join Georgina and a boy named Pete Fairman at a hotel, who hid a video camera in the room to tape him and Serena having sex. Serena wasn't in the mood, though, and instead passed Pete a line of cocaine which he subsequently overdosed on. Panicked Serena called the emergency services and she and Georgina fled the hotel. After learning that Pete had died Serena ran away to boarding school.

It is learned that Chuck lost his virginity to Georgina in the 6th grade and he remembers her partying attitude before Serena went to boarding school. Serena tells them that Georgina is blackmailing her into continuing the lifestyle they used to have.

At Rufus's concert, Dan and Vanessa learn that Sarah is in fact Georgina. Vanessa is told the truth by Nate but Georgina successfully deceives Dan by concocting a story about an abusive ex-boyfriend. In light of Dan and Serena's break-up over her constant lies to cover-up her secrets, Georgina tells Dan that she fell in love at first sight with him, they kissed, then Georgina phones Serena on Dan's phone and tells her “all bets are off” implying she'll be having sex with him that night. Dan and Georgina then walk away together holding hands.

The next morning Serena confronts Georgina at Dan's apartment and furiously tries to attack her. After Georgina leaves Serena eventually tells Dan the truth which he believes and with the help of Blair, Dan devises a plan to get rid of Georgina. Dan calls Georgina up and has her meet him in Central Park; he consequently leaves her after she confesses her feelings for him and is met by Blair who has tracked down Georgina's parents. Blair reveals that Georgina was supposed to be at an equestrian circuit but sold her show pony for cocaine. Georgina was in fact in a rehabilitation center in Utah where she escaped, hitchhiked into a town, stole a credit card and booked a ticket to Ibiza. Georgina is left with her parents who decide her fate by sending her to a boot camp for troubled young girls, originally where Lily threatened to send Serena amidst her daughters old habits returning, upon Blair's suggestion.

Season 2
Georgina Sparks returns in the second season but is transformed into a sweet woman believing in the power of Jesus. Although she appears to have genuinely changed, she is rejected by Blair, Chuck, Dan and Serena who all do not take her seriously. Blair eventually uses her in a scheme that would have Poppy Lifton arrested after a Ponzi scheme she had concocted with Gabriel compromised Serena's reputation. Georgina unfortunately loses the money that she intended to buy Bibles for Christian children to Poppy, Blair accuses her of sabotaging the plan and that she will never be forgiven by Jesus as well as herself. Georgina, upset and adamant that she didn't do anything wrong, reverts to her old self at the end of the episode, with the intent of getting her money back. She calls Blair, scolding her for being unable to get rid of Poppy and confirming her return to her old habits by telling her, "You can tell Jesus that the bitch is back."

In the second-season finale, Georgina returns and informs Dan that Poppy Lifton has been taken care of and that the money has been returned. In a twist, she also reveals that she will be attending NYU the following year, where she is enrolled at the Gallatin School of Individualized Study. She also requests to be Blair Waldorf's roommate.<ref>{{cite web |url=http://nymag.com/daily/intel/2009/05/gossip_girls_georgina_ex_machi.html |title='Gossip Girls Georgina Ex-Machina |work=New York|access-date= 19 May 2009 }}</ref>

Season 3

Georgina appears in the third season of the show as Blair's roommate. She convinces Dan and Vanessa that she has changed, even though she is plotting revenge against Blair. She starts a relationship with Dan, not realizing that he was not interested in anything serious. Georgina is still up to her old ways by sending Blair on a wild goose chase for entering a secret society. After Serena discovers this scheme tells Dan that Georgina created a scheme that threatened to ruin Chuck and Blair's relationship, he decides to end things with her. It is then revealed that she has grown very attached to Dan. Because he broke things off with her, she plans to find another way to cause more damage. At the end of the third episode in the season, Georgina plans to make a trip to Boston after she overhears Scott bidding farewell to Vanessa, with that Scott Adler is in fact Rufus and Lily's son.

Georgina returns from Boston only to learn that Dan is dating Olivia Burke. Georgina then blackmails Vanessa to get Dan to dump Olivia or she'll reveal to everyone that she knows about Scott's secret, knowing that Vanessa's friendship with the Humphreys could be jeopardized if they found out that she had been hiding secrets from them. Vanessa later confesses to Dan about her own knowledge of Scott's true identity and the fact that Georgina is using this to blackmail her. Georgina crashes Rufus' wedding where Dan and Georgina share a conversation that reveals that Poppy Lifton had been deported. Georgina arrives at the wedding and reveals to Rufus and Lily that Scott is their lovechild and leaves, taking a slice of the wedding cake and driving Blair to get rid of her. Georgina is last seen in a bar with Vanya, disguised as a prince, who leaves with her, stating that he'll be taking her to Belarus. Dorota is shown looking on, hinting that it was Blair behind the entire scenario to get rid of Georgina.

The third-season finale has Georgina return from Belarus wearing a blond wig and large coat, desperately seeking the help of various Upper-East Siders with her "problem." However, they all dismiss Georgina, as Blair is too worried about Chuck to listen to her, and Dan and Serena do not notice her new disguise while at the hospital. In the season finale, Georgina arrives at the loft with "something" of Dan's. It is revealed that Georgina is pregnant with what she says is Dan's child.

Season 4
In the season premiere "Belles de Jour" it is revealed Georgina had a son, Milo, born on July 7, 2010, but it is unknown if Dan Humphrey is the father at first because they never did a DNA test. Georgina then gives a fake DNA test so that Dan will sign Milo's birth certificate. It is later revealed to be another one of her schemes when she abruptly leaves New York, leaving Dan alone with Milo. She left a note saying that she went to the "spa". Whilst she is away, Rufus does a DNA test himself, and breaks the news to Dan that he isn't Milo's biological father. In the episode "The Undergraduates", Georgina returns from the "spa" (she was in fact in St. Barts) to collect Milo, and ends up telling Dan about Serge, Milo's real father, because he knows that she has been lying. She also declares that she and Milo are going to live with Georgina's parents. Georgina returns in the season finale attending a Constance Billiard alumni dance. She reveals to Serena that she is living in Bedford, New York and is now married, but bored, from the lifestyle she sought to raise her son in. Georgina seeks to maintain her need to scheme as she offers her aid in catching Charlie, finding out later that she has her own agenda - one that Georgina takes interest in. She offers her home phone number to Charlie and tells her to give her a call in case she ever needs her.

Season 5
Georgina returns to the Upper East Side with her husband, Phil, for the royal wedding of Blair and Louis in order to ruin Blair's happy ending as revenge for the many things Blair has done to her. She is caught inside the church by Rufus and Lily who have her thrown out, but not before she ends up recording Blair's confession of love to Chuck before the wedding commences. Georgina leaves the video in Chuck's hands. After 'Gossip Girl' plays the video, Georgina is confronted by Dan, Nate and Serena, but Georgina denies any involvement and accuses each of them of sending the video, before promptly leaving. Georgina is seen to be posting a blast on the Gossip Girl website.

After Blair's wedding, Georgina locks Dorota in Blair's closet in an attempt to find Blair and destroy what she thinks is Blair's "happily ever after". When Chuck and Serena free Dorota, she follows them to the hotel in which Dan and Blair are hiding out and takes a photo while framing Serena for sending the video to Gossip Girl. After taking her camera back from Serena, Georgina is seen putting up a video of Blair and Louis leaving for their honeymoon. Georgina reveals to Phil, her husband/accomplice, that the real 'Gossip Girl' abandoned her post following Chuck and Blair's accident. Phil appears to love Georgina and knows all about her past and of her agenda against everyone she knows on the Upper East Side and he assists her in times of need despite the fact that she often treats him badly and ignores their baby, Milo, leaving Phil as the parental caregiver at home while she goes out to work her ways.

Following Blair's return from her honeymoon, Georgina learns that Ivy is back in town and goes to the Van der Woodsens' to confront her. While at a party thrown by Nate, Dan discovers that she is Gossip Girl and he blackmails her with this information as she is trying to get Blair to default on her marriage to Louis, thereby effectively ruining her family's financial security. Georgina and Serena witness a kiss between Dan and Blair that Georgina manages to get a photo of.

Georgina appears briefly in the season finale. Dan, having seemingly been dumped by Blair, alienated and betrayed by Serena, Lily, Chuck, Nate and everyone that he knows, approaches Georgina, asking for help to publish the sequel to "Inside", pledging to write the novel "he should have written from the beginning". Georgina, with her own personal score to settle with all of the characters of the Upper East side, is happy to help.

Season 6
At the start of Season 6, Georgina is working as Dan's book agent, and she works to secure publications that would be willing to publish his exposé about the Upper East Side. However, she also helps Chuck, Blair, Serena, Ivy and Sage Spence take down Chuck's father, Bart Bass. In the series finale, after Bart has fallen to his death after his rooftop confrontation with Chuck, Georgina helps Blair and Chuck escape the crime scene. Georgina ends up teaming with Jack Bass to bring everyone together for Chuck and Blair's wedding. After it is revealed that Dan has been acting as Gossip Girl, Georgina (along with the other characters) realizes that it's time to move on from the fighting and backstabbing and move on with life. At the time jump at the end of the episode, it's revealed that she and Jack have become a couple, and has also become friends with the other members of the circle.

2021 sequel series
Milo, Georgina's son, appears in the first season of the 2021 sequel series. Milo is diabolical and inherited his mother’s intellectual brilliance. In the episode "Fire Walks with Z", he invites Zoya to Georgina's home. She is absent but several photos of her with famous men can be seen. She also has a portrait of Blair Waldorf in her house. 

Georgina returns in the episode "How to Bury a Millionaire" from season two after discovering Kate's is behind the new Gossip Girl. She blackmails Kate into working for her. However, she leaves after Kate ruined her plan.

Reception
CNN included the introduction of Georgina in the list of the series' "OMG" moments, writing that she is "the kind of insane yet hilarious character that can make any episode better." Chicago Tribune described her as "one of the series' all-time best troublemakers." BuddyTV found Georgina "amazing" in the 100th episode, "you can't even take your eyes off her because she's so great in every scene."
Sparks was included in TV Guide list of the best TV bitches. However, Entertainment Weekly'' named her one of the "21 Most Annoying TV Characters Ever". Trachtenberg was nominated at the 2012 Teen Choice Awards under the category "Choice TV Villain" for her portrayal of Sparks.

References

Characters in American novels of the 21st century
Female characters in literature
Fictional blackmailers
Fictional characters from New York City
Fictional drug addicts
Fictional socialites
Gossip Girl characters
Literary characters introduced in 2003
Teenage characters in literature
Teenage characters in television
American female characters in television